The HP Pavilion TX Series is a series of convertible notebook computers from Hewlett Packard introduced in February 2007.

TX1000  
These notebooks are designed for Windows Vista. The TX series uses the AMD Turion 64 X2 series of processors. This series has a 12.1-inch touch screen and a DVD+RW; it competed well with the top-of-the-line tablets at the time of its release. All models came with an NVIDIA GeForce Go 6150 graphics system, which features 128 MB of integrated graphics and an extra shared graphics memory of up to 916 MB.
This model has been superseded by the HP Touchsmart tx2 Series, and subsequently by the HP Touchsmart tm2.

Design 
The series is delivered with the HP Imprint Finish. The form factor is referred to as a "convertible tablet", that is, the screen can be rotated to use the notebook as a slate with the included stylus. The current model has a glossy, black plastic casing and a perforated touchpad. The speakers are located near the hinge, on the screen; and the webcam on the top of the screen. The stereo microphones are also mounted on the screen and the tablet comes with an optional fingerprint reader. The standard 6-cell battery juts out to form a hand-grip and the DVD drive can be replaced with a plastic "weight-saver".

Specifications 
 Processor: AMD Turion(TM) 64 X2 Dual-Core 
 Screen:12.1″ WXGA BrightView LED back-lit [semi-glossy/matte] (1280×800) with passive touchscreen (without Wacom Penabled digitizer)
 Graphics:NVIDIA GeForce Go 6150
 Webcam + Dual Mic
 Fingerprint Reader (Optional)
 PC-5300 RAM 1GB [base config], 2GB, 3GB, 4GB
 SATA Hard Drive, 160GB [base config], 250GB, 320GB
 Removable LightScribe DVD+/-RW w/Double Layer 
 Wireless: 802.11 a/b/g/draft n WLAN [base config]; Bluetooth 2.1 (optional)
 Verizon Wireless V740 ExpressCard (requires data plan) 
 Battery: Lithium Ion  6 Cell [base config]/ 4 Cell/ 8 Cell

Criticism 
Within a few months of release of the tx1000 series, numerous technical failures were reported on internet blogs, review sites and HP's own support websites. These included webcam, audio, speaker, BIOS, power management, overheating, booting, and wireless adapter problems. Some were addressed in a timely manner with driver updates, but other users were still forced to turn the notebook on and off repeatedly until it booted up, while others were left with a non-working "bricked" unit. HP released an updated model, the HP Pavilion tx2, which in turn was followed by the HP TouchSmart tm2. HP never issued a recall for its tx1 model.

TX2000

TX2500

References

External links 
 Notebook Review of the tx1000
 HP TX2000 later version

HP laptops
Microsoft Tablet PC